Villafrades de Campos is a municipality located in the province of Valladolid, Castile and León, Spain. According to the 2004 census (INE), the municipality has a population of 101 inhabitants.

Village's festivities are more than known where each year tradition and alcohol rally hundreds looking for the best rural festival around.

References

Municipalities in the Province of Valladolid